Talking Pictures TV (TPTV) is a British free-to-air vintage-film and nostalgia television channel. It was launched on 26 May 2015 on Sky channel 343, but later also became available on Freeview, Freesat, and Virgin Media. It is on air for 24 hours a day and features mainly older British films, both classics and B-films, but the schedule also includes some American films, straight-to-video programmes, cinema shorts, extended interviews with veteran actors, and period home movies of British locations.

In July 2018, Talking Pictures TV had an audience share of 0.50%. , it had reached an audience share of 0.63%.

Foundation
TPTV is a family business, founded by producer/editor Noel Cronin, and run by his daughter Sarah Cronin-Stanley with her husband Neill Stanley. Films in many genres (horror, comedy, drama and thriller) are included in the schedule. In-house productions are also shown, as are items from the Cronins' own back catalogue, including Noel's Dandelion Distribution, as well as series from the archive of Southern Television, a former ITV contractor, and early American television shows. Movies are usually copied directly from film reels; damaged reels from the catalogue are often replaced by donations, either from online, viewers or available libraries.

One of the aims of the founders was to maintain the history of British cinema; it was said to have been in the making since 2007. Older movies, including those made in black and white, were once regularly shown on terrestrial channels, such as BBC and Channel 4, but such programming had declined by the 2000s, with only the best known classic films occasionally being aired. Cronin-Stanley explained to the Watford Observer in 2016 that "People were interested in the big titles but he [her father Noel] wanted to save the smaller, more obscure titles, from getting lost". However, television networks rejected their pitches, unconvinced that it would be of high demand, so they decided to set up the channel independently. Cronin-Stanley later explained that the channel specialises in "the things people have forgotten".

Availability
Talking Pictures TV was initially only available via digital satellite on the Sky platform in the United Kingdom and Ireland. Since 15 September 2015, the channel has also been available on Freeview. It became available on Freesat channel 306 in February 2016, and on Virgin Media on 1 June 2017. On Freeview, it was initially broadcast only in standard definition (SDTV) on a HD multiplex and could be received only by Freeview HD equipment. From 30 November 2017, the channel became available, to those within coverage (90 percent of UK households), on any TV capable of receiving Freeview.  In 2018, the channel reportedly had a weekly audience of about 2 million, but BBC News reported that it possibly rose to as high as 6 million in mid-2020 (during the COVID-19 pandemic).

Broadcast output

Films
A list of selected films shown on Talking Pictures TV:

Television series
Talking Pictures TV features several classic television series from American broadcasters ABC, CBS, and NBC, as well as British series, mostly from Southern Television productions for the ITV network. Many of the American television shows were produced by Four Star Television.

New television programmes for 2022 include The Heritage Chart Show with Mike Read, a pop music countdown of videos and live performances from veteran acts, presented on Sunday nights by the former Radio 1 disc jockey Mike Read and shared with the Local TV network of channels. Also Read can be seen each week with Talking Pictures TV founder Noel Cronin on the channel's archive programme The Footage Detectives, a show which discusses forgotten films and lost TV shows such as The Barnstormers from 1964.

British programmes

American programmes

Other
Talking Pictures TV also features several films from the series featuring Old Mother Riley, and from the British Film Institute's (BFI) archives, including several significant documentaries, and a considerable number of Children's Film Foundation productions, named under a series segment Glimpses. Its intention is for both nostalgia and education, as well as reminding the audience of the past; some footage is donated by viewers. The series is the most popular original content on the channel and its compilation DVD is the most popular buy on Renown Film's website.

The Take Two series was presented by Elstree historian Morris Bright, and occasionally Robert Ross and/or the channel creators, who interview famous actors whose films and programming is airing on the channel, such as Nanette Newman, Angela Douglas, Rita Tushingham, Sylvia Syms, Michael Craig, Shirley Eaton, Sally Thomsett, Jack Smethurst, Jenny Hanley, Norman Eshley, Valerie Leon, Madeline Smith, Marc Sinden, and Janette Scott; a few of them recorded station idents for the channel. An interview with A Family at War creator John Finch was also aired, as well as Neil Sean Meets..., an interviewing series presented by Neil Sean, who has interviewed historians and celebrities of the mid-20th century, such as Tommy Steele, Roger Moore and Eden Kane.

Interviews from 2018 onwards have been filmed in the Cinema Museum in the wake of the museum's foreclosure announcement; the interviewees there include Mark Lester, George Layton, Anita Harris, Sid James's daughter Reina, Anneke Wills, and Peter Butterworth's son Tyler. Some interviews in the series were later released on a DVD collection named Talking Pictures with....

Themed days
The channel has featured themed days, such as "An Afternoon with Liz Fraser" (14 August 2016), "1960s Day", "Sophia Loren Evening" (20 September 2016), "Music Hall Monday" (18 January 2016), "Diana Dors Day" (14 May 2017), and "An Afternoon with Patricia Dainton" (12 April 2016), in which the actress came out of retirement to provide introductions to her films.  "Laurel and Hardy Month" aired their short films and feature-length productions throughout September 2017 and their movies continue to be shown.  "Ronald Colman Season" occurred throughout November and December 2016, airing movies such as The Devil to Pay!, Bulldog Drummond, and Raffles.

15 February 2018 was "Sam Kydd Day", with showings of a handful of his movies and television appearances, excerpts from his diaries and anecdotes of his life from his son Jonathan. 15 March 2019 was "John Gregson Day" which featured movies and television that starred/featured the actor, along with interviews with his family members and remaining cast members of his filmography. There have also been special guests that host their favourite vintage media that has appeared on the channel, such as Danny Baker and Vic Reeves.

Themed nights
In 2021, the channel introduced The Cellar Club with Caroline Munro, a Friday night block of crime, sci-fi and horror films, like 1974 Hammer production Captain Kronos The Vampire Hunter and Joseph Green's The Brain That Wouldn't Die from 1962.

Controversy, racial slurs
The regulator Ofcom has warned the channel about the use of racial slurs in its programming on a handful of occasions, including an episode of Granada Television's A Family at War, originally broadcast in the early 1970s, shown by TPTV in the hour just before the 9pm watershed, and an uncensored interview with Joan Turner during her appearance on the talk show Tell Me Another.

Cronin-Stanley told The Times in February 2018: "Ofcom say we need to advise people before they watch something that it may contain outdated racial stereotyping, but I would say that’s babysitting our audience". However, since late 2018, warning notices have been displayed just before some programmes begin, stating, for example, that a programme "was made between 1978 and 1992" and that "Some viewers may be offended by the language and attitudes expressed by some characters ... which reflect the time it was made." In addition, occurrences of such terms may be removed from the soundtrack and the subtitles.

Related projects

Renown Pictures
For over 20 years, Cronin-Stanley and Cronin have been patrons of a DVD membership club, The Renown Film Club, for fans of B-film classics. Cronin had worked for The Rank Organisation and Central Office of Information, and bought the rights to several libraries that owned films that air on TPTV, such as much of the Southern Television library, and originally licensed them out to terrestrial channels. Many of the films aired on Talking Pictures TV are available to buy on DVD, often sold as compilations under different genres, through the distributing company, both online and through the Renown's telephone service. Each DVD set is full of films made between the 1930s and 1960s, and also include special features, such as interviews and history. Other merchandise is also sold on the website, such as mugs, clothing, biographies, and calendars (available to buy in December for the new year), often branded under Talking Pictures TV's name. In spring 2019, Renown released its first CD compilation album named Hits From the Flicks, three CDs of songs from musicals and movies with pop song theme tunes that had aired on the channel.

The Renown Film Festival
Since 2014, the channel's producers created the Renown Film Festival, which celebrates classic British film, featuring guest appearances by actors whose films have been aired, as well as historians, who give interviews; there are also screenings for films that were once considered lost, and memorabilia available to buy and be autographed by the actors. It occurs annually in February, and tickets are advertised on both TPTV's website and the channel. Actors who have appeared on the guest lists include Jess Conrad (who reunited with the remaining cast of The Boys in 2017), Rita Tushingham, Brian Murphy, Melvyn Hayes, and Derren Nesbitt. The festival takes place in Hertfordshire, such as Watersmeet Theatre, Rickmansworth and St. Albans' The Alban Arena, but 2019 was the first year to have more than one festival in a year; October 2019 was the Renown Film's 6th Festival of Film at the Stockport Plaza, which also featured special guests, film screenings, and memorabilia. Although tickets sold out, St. Albans' 2020 Festival was postponed due to the coronavirus outbreak.

Podcast
A spin-off podcast named The Talking Pictures TV Podcast was announced in December 2018 by Adam Roche, the creator of the podcasts The Secret History of Hollywood and Attaboy Clarence, and began broadcasting on 3 February 2019. Each episode is uploaded monthly to coincide with TPTV's schedule releases and invites the audience to review movies and television programmes that will broadcast on the channel during that month. Its first episode became the most popular podcast in the UK iTunes chart within roughly five hours.

TPTV Encore
On 1 December 2021, TPTV Encore launched. It is Talking Pictures TV's official streaming service for viewers to catch up with the latest media recently aired on the channel, as well as hosting Renown Pictures' Southern TV archive.

See also
List of television stations in the United Kingdom
Renown Pictures

Notes

References

External links

2015 establishments in the United Kingdom
British Film Institute
Children's Film Foundation
Classic television networks
Companies based in Hertfordshire
English-language television stations in the United Kingdom
Family-owned companies of the United Kingdom
Film organisations in the United Kingdom
Film archives in the United Kingdom
Film preservation
Independent television stations
Mass media in Hertfordshire
Movie channels
Movie channels in the United Kingdom
Organisations based in Hertfordshire
Television archives in the United Kingdom
Television channels and stations established in 2015
Television channels in the United Kingdom